Karlsbad may refer to:

Karlovy Vary, Czech Republic (formerly known by its German name Karlsbad, and known as Carlsbad in English)
Karlsbad (Baden), Germany
Melluži, Latvian resort, formerly known to tourists as Karlsbad

See also
Carlsbad (disambiguation)